Shmuel Katz (August 18, 1926 – March 26, 2010) was an Israeli artist, illustrator, and cartoonist. A Holocaust survivor and postwar immigrant to Mandate Palestine via the detention camps on Cyprus, he figured prominently in Israeli illustration and newspaper cartooning, widely exhibiting and publishing his drawings and paintings at home and abroad, for which he won numerous local and international awards. His sketches and watercolors are known for their sprightly lines and touches of humor.

Biography
Shmuel Alexander (Sandor) Katz was born in Vienna, Austria, to parents of Hungarian origin. Following the Anschluss, Austria's annexation by Nazi Germany in March 1938, the family relocated to Hungary. He attended school, studied the piano, and became a member of the Zionist youth movement HaNoar HaTzioni. After the Nazi invasion of Hungary in 1944, he was deported to a forced labor camp in Yugoslavia from which he escaped to Budapest where he was among the thousands of Jews hidden in the "Glass House" shelter operated by Swiss diplomat Carl Lutz, until the arrival of the Soviet Red Army in mid-February 1945.

In Budapest, Katz joined the youth movement Hashomer Hatzair. He began studying architecture there in the Budapest University of Technology and Economics. In 1946, in the framework of the Aliyah Bet illegal immigration, he sailed aboard the Knesset Israel which was apprehended by the British and its passengers interned in a detention camp on Cyprus.

In 1947, Katz secured a legal immigration certificate as a member of the "First of May" nucleus group of Hashomer Hatzair. The group did its pioneering training at Kibbutz Eilon on the Lebanese border, and on October 8, 1948, became the founders of Kibbutz Ga'aton in the Western Galilee, where Katz spent the rest of his life. He designed the kibbutz dining room whose interior features Hungarian folkloristic wood carving.

Art career
During the years 1950–1953 Shemuel Katz illustrated Mishmar Layeladim, the weekly children's supplement to the Mapam party's newspaper, Al HaMishmar. 
In 1953–1954, he enrolled in the École nationale supérieure des Beaux-Arts in Paris, France, where he studied lithography, copperplate etching, fresco, and music, and toured the lands of Western Europe.
In 1955, he joined the editorial board of Al HaMishmar as illustrator and graphics editor.
In 1958, he traveled through East Africa, a journey whose impressions influenced his artistic and technical style and led to the 1962 publication of A Journey to the Land of Kush together with author Nathan Shaham. In 1976 he visited Iran, and the following November in Tehran exhibited artworks featuring Iran and Jerusalem. 
In 1979, Katz paid two visits to Egypt with the "Autonomy" delegation and was granted a private interview with Egyptian president Anwar Sadat. In 1983, he visited Hungary as a member of a delegation from Peace Now.

Shemuel Katz's artworks have been exhibited extensively in Israel and abroad. His watercolors of Jerusalem have been reproduced as posters and postcards. His courtroom sketches of Adolf Eichmann's trial in Jerusalem, 1961, are held in the art collection of Yad Vashem, Israel's Holocaust Remembrance Authority. As an artist in the IDF, he sketched soldiers on guard and at war.
Katz is well known as the illustrator of hundreds of books, especially for Sifriat Poalim, the Kibbutz Artzi movement's publishing house. Especially popular are his illustrated classics of Israeli children's literature, such as Igeal Mozinsohn's Hasamba series and poet Leah Goldberg's Flat for Rent, whose cover art was used for a postage stamp.

Katz published editorial cartoons and illustrations in the Israeli dailies Al HaMishmar, and Maariv, the weekly kibbutz supplement of the mass-circulation Yedioth Aharonoth, as well as the Swiss satirical periodical, Nebelspalter.

Katz died at a hospital in Nahariya at the age of 83. He is survived by his wife Naomi and two daughters. His daughter Yael is married to politician Dov Khenin.

Awards and honors
1959  – Medal at the International Exhibition of Book Art, Leipzig, Germany
1961  – First prize in Drawing and Watercolor of the Biennale for Young Artists, Paris, France
1974  – Nordau Prize for Art, Tel Aviv, Israel
1985  – Nachum Gutman Memorial Award of the Tel Aviv municipality
1997  – International Award for Caricature, Budapest, Hungary
2006  – "Dosh" Memorial Award for Caricature, Einav Center, Tel Aviv
2007  – First "Golden Pencil" Award of the Israeli Museum of Caricature and Comic Art, Holon, Israel

References

Further reading
 Shemuel Katz's autobiography, Goralo shel Tsayar: Kav Over bein Austria, Hungaria, ve-Yisrael, Sifriat Poalim, 2003 . Originally published in German Mein Schicksal war die Ausnahme: Erinnerungen eines Zeichners un Karikaturisten an Österreich, Ungarn und Israel, Wien, St. Pölten, 2001, ed. Dr. Martha Keil, Institut für Geschichte der Juden in Österreich

External links
Portrait photo of the artist at work
Israeli cityscapes in watercolor
Courtroom illustrations of the Adolf Eichmann trial, 1961 Art Collection of Yad Vashem
Cartoons in "Al HaMishmar"
Illustrations for classics of Israeli children’s literature

1926 births
2010 deaths
Jewish escapees from Nazi concentration camps
Hungarian emigrants to Israel
Hungarian Jews
Israeli Jews
Israeli caricaturists
Israeli illustrators
Israeli painters
Kibbutzniks
Jewish artists
Artists from Vienna
Jewish emigrants from Austria after the Anschluss